Karl Gustav Evert Wetterström (15 October 1911 – 16 November 1991) was a Swedish footballer who played as a striker.

He played for IK Sleipner and the Sweden national football team, for whom he appeared in the 1938 FIFA World Cup. He scored a hat trick in Sweden's 8-0 victory over Cuba, although many sources outside of FIFA have credited him with scoring 4 goals in that match.

Career statistics

International 

 Scores and results list Sweden's goal tally first, score column indicates score after each Wetterström goal.

Honours 
IK Sleipner

 Allsvenskan: 1937–1938

References

1911 births
1938 FIFA World Cup players
Swedish footballers
Sweden international footballers
1991 deaths

Association football forwards